Major League Baseball (MLB) honors its best rookies with a Rookie of the Month Award for one player in the American League (AL) and one in the National League (NL) during each month of the regular season. These awards have been issued since 2001, with players at all positions eligible.

Awards by month
The below tables list the winners in each league, since the award was established in 2001.

In two instances, the award has been shared by players for the same month: Josh Johnson and Dan Uggla for June 2006 in the National League (NL); and Ben Revere and Jemile Weeks for June 2011 in the American League (AL).

Out of a possible six months during a player's rookie season, the most times a player has been named Rookie of the Month is four, achieved by Ichiro Suzuki (2001, AL), Mike Trout (2012, AL) and Aaron Judge (2017, AL). Three-time winners have been Jason Bay (2004, NL), José Abreu (2014, AL), Juan Soto (2018 NL), Pete Alonso (2019, NL), and Yordan Álvarez (2019, AL). A number of players have won it twice.

The majority of players named Rookie of the Year were also recognized as a Rookie of the Month at least once, since the latter was established. The exceptions have been Huston Street (2005, AL), Hanley Ramírez (2006, NL), Michael Fulmer (2016, AL), Kyle Lewis (2020, AL), Devin Williams (2020, NL) and Randy Arozarena (2021, AL).

In the below tables, a name in italics indicates the player was later named Rookie of the Year for his league.

American League

National League

Source:

See also

Baseball awards
List of MLB awards

References

Rookie of the Month
Rookie player awards
Awards established in 2001